The 1844 Victoria One Penny Model was a model coin issued by Birmingham medallist Joseph Moore (1817–1892) between 1844 and 1848, during a period in which the British Government were considering the notion of replacing the heavy copper coinage then in use.

Their popularity with the public led to the Royal Mint  to make a statement declaring that it was not responsible for their production.

A feature that sets them apart from other coins of their age is that they were bimetallic. The outer part was made of copper, and the inner part was originally composed of silver to make up for the small intrinsic value of copper — but in most cases 60 percent zinc and 40 percent nickel were used.

The design features an outer ring in which on the obverse and reverse the words 'ONE PENNY MODEL' are printed and an inner circle on the obverse of which a youthful portrait of Queen Victoria is shown with the words 'VICTORIA REG', and on the reverse is shown a numeral 1.

There are four known specimens of the 1844 model pennies; all the rest are Model Pennies which do not have 1844 on them.

References

Pennies